André Le Guillerm (5 September 1924 – 2 December 2014) was a French weightlifter. He competed in the men's featherweight event at the 1948 Summer Olympics.

References

1924 births
2014 deaths
French male weightlifters
Olympic weightlifters of France
Weightlifters at the 1948 Summer Olympics
Sportspeople from Paris